Dominic Boesel (born 24 October 1989) is a German professional boxer who has held the IBO light-heavyweight title since October 2021. He previously held the WBA interim and IBO light-heavyweight titles from 2019 to 2020. At regional level, he held the European light-heavyweight title from 2018 to 2019.

Professional career

Boesel made his professional debut on 20 November 2010, scoring a first-round technical knockout (TKO) victory over Patrick Baumann at the Freiberger Arena in Dresden, Germany. After compiling a record of 26–1 (10 KO), he challenged Serhiy Demchenko on 3 March 2018 for the vacant European light-heavyweight title at Stadthalle in Weissenfels, winning the title by unanimous decision. Two judges scored the bout 116–112 and the third scored it 118–110. On 16 November 2019 he challenged IBO light-heavyweight champion Sven Fornling at the Halle Messe Arena in Halle, Germany, with the vacant WBA interim title also on the line. Boesel won the fight via eleventh round TKO.

Professional boxing record

See also
 List of world light-heavyweight boxing champions

References

External links
 

 

1989 births
Living people
People from Naumburg (Saale)
German male boxers
Light-heavyweight boxers
World light-heavyweight boxing champions
European Boxing Union champions
International Boxing Organization champions
Sportspeople from Saxony-Anhalt